Victor Posa (born November 5, 1966) is a former ice hockey defenceman.

Victor Posa was born in Bari, Italy.  Victor  played Junior Hockey in the OHL for Toronto and also played college hockey for the Wisconsin Badgers. He was drafted 137th overall by the Chicago Black Hawks in the 1985 NHL Entry Draft and played two games for them in the 1985–86 season. He currently lives in Grand Blanc, Michigan. He currently is an amateur scout for the Montreal Canadiens. He has two sons who both play hockey. His son Saverio played in the OHL for the Windsor Spitfires, and now plays in the ECHL for the Cincinnati Cyclones. His other son Benito played for the Muskegon Lumberjacks in the USHL. Victor appeared on Season 8 Episode 10 of Dragons Den, presenting a new skate guard product.

References

External links

1966 births
Arizona Coyotes scouts
Chicago Blackhawks draft picks
Chicago Blackhawks players
Detroit Falcons (CoHL) players
Huntsville Blast players
Italian emigrants to Canada
Italian ice hockey defencemen
Living people
Montreal Canadiens scouts
Sportspeople from Bari
Toronto Marlboros players
Wisconsin Badgers men's ice hockey players